Kharkiv Petro Vasylenko National Technical University of Agriculture is a Ukrainian university in Kharkiv.

Post address: 61002, Kharkiv, vulytsya Artema, 44

Institutes and faculties

The Education and Research Institute of Mechatronics and Management systems (ERI MMS)
The Education and Research Institute of Electrical engineering and Computer Technologies (ERI EECT)
The Education and Research Institute of Technical Service (ERI TS)
The Education and Research Institute of Processing and Food Technologies (ERI PFT)
The Education and Research Institute of Business and Management (ERI BM)
The Education and Research Institute of Distance and Correspondence Education (ERI DCE)
The Education and Research Institute of Post-Diploma Education (ERI PDE)
KhNTUA College of Processing and Food Industry
KhNTUA Vovchansk Technical School
The Technological Research Institute (TRI)
The Institute of Innovation Management (IIM)
The Educational Centre for Training and Retraining the Agro-Industrial Complex Specialists

Awards and reputation
According to the All-Ukrainian independent rating "TOP-200 Ukraine" the university is the second among agrarian universities and the 61st among 200 best educational establishments of Ukraine due to the devised and realized innovation "Program of Sustainable Development".

The university was awarded with Honourable Diplomas from Kharkiv Regional Administration, Cabinet of Ministers of Ukraine, and with 1st class ‘Exemplary Educationalist of Agrarian Science" of the Ministry of Agrarian Policy and Foodstuffs of Ukraine for the great contribution in AIC reforms support and training of high quality specialists for agriculture.

References
Official site
Ukrainian Wikipedia

1930 establishments in Ukraine
National universities in Ukraine